Dani Rodríguez is the name of:

Dani Rodríguez (footballer, born 1988), Spanish footballer
Dani Rodríguez (footballer, born 2005), Spanish footballer